Oluwafikayomi Oluwadamilola "Fikayo" Tomori (born 19 December 1997) is a professional footballer who plays as a centre-back for  club AC Milan and the England national team. Born in Canada, he represents England at international level.

Early life
Tomori was born in Calgary, Alberta, Canada to Nigerian parents. Before the age of one, Tomori moved with his family to England where he was raised. He began playing for Riverview United in Kent when he was six. Growing up, his footballing idol was Thierry Henry.

Club career

Chelsea

2005–2016: Youth career
Tomori joined the Chelsea Academy at under-8 level and progressed through the club's academy system. He was part of the Chelsea youth side which recorded back to back triumphs in both the UEFA Youth League and the FA Youth Cup in 2015 and 2016.

On 11 May 2016, Tomori was named to the first-team substitute bench along with fellow academy players Tammy Abraham and Kasey Palmer, in Chelsea's 1–1 draw with Liverpool. However, he failed to make an appearance at Anfield. On 15 May, in Chelsea's final game of the 2015–16 season, Tomori made his debut in a 1–1 draw with Premier League champions Leicester City, replacing Branislav Ivanović in the 60th minute. Although Tomori was included in the United States pre-season tour, he did not make a single appearance. On 1 August, Tomori signed a new four-year contract ahead of the 2016–17 season.

2017: Loan to Brighton & Hove Albion
On 23 January 2017, Tomori joined Championship club Brighton & Hove Albion on loan for the remainder of the 2016–17 season. Five days later, Tomori made his Brighton debut in a 3–1 away defeat against National League team Lincoln City in the FA Cup fourth round, in which he scored an own goal to give Lincoln the lead. On 18 February 2017, Tomori made his league debut for Brighton, in their 2–0 away victory against Barnsley, replacing Anthony Knockaert in stoppage time of the second half. On 18 March 2017, Tomori was given his first start for Brighton in their 2–0 away defeat against Leeds United, featuring for the entire 90 minutes.

2017–18: Loan to Hull City
On 31 August 2017, Tomori joined Championship club Hull City on a season long loan deal. He made his debut on 13 September 2017, in a 2–1 defeat away to Fulham.

2018–19: Loan to Derby County
On 6 August 2018, Tomori joined Championship club Derby County on a season long loan. He made his debut on 11 August in a 4–1 loss against Leeds United. His time at the club saw him named the club's "Player of the Year".

2019–20: First-team breakthrough

On 31 August 2019, Tomori made his first start for Chelsea against Sheffield United, which ended a 2–2 draw at Stamford Bridge. He scored his first goal for Chelsea on 14 September, opening the scoring with long-range curling shot from outside the penalty area, in a 5–2 away win over Wolverhampton Wanderers. He scored a header against former club Hull City to help Chelsea to a 2–1 win in the fourth round of the FA Cup at the KCOM Stadium on 25 January 2020.

AC Milan
On 22 January 2021, Tomori joined Serie A club AC Milan on loan for the remainder of the 2020–21 season with an option to buy. Four days later, he made his debut in the Coppa Italia quarter-final against Inter Milan in the Derby della Madonnina, coming on as a substitute for the injured Simon Kjær in a 2–1 away defeat. On 9 May, Tomori scored his first goal for Milan in a 3–0 away league win over rivals Juventus. Tomori became the first Englishman to score for Milan since David Beckham in 2009 and it was the club's first away win against Juventus in the league since March 2011.

On 17 June 2021, Tomori signed a permanent deal with Milan until 30 June 2025, after the club exercised their £25m buy option from his previous loan. He scored his first goal of the season on 7 December, against Liverpool in a Champions League match which Milan lost 2–1. With his teammate Simon Kjær out of action for the remainder of the season due to injury, Tomori became a regular in the starting line-up. On 12 March 2022, as Milan won 1–0 against Empoli, they managed to secure two clean sheets in a row for the first time in 2022, courtesy of Tomori partnering in defence with Pierre Kalulu.

On 12 August 2022, Tomori signed a new contract with Milan until June 2027. On 8 March 2023, he was named Player of the Match in the Champions League round of 16 second leg away match against Tottenham Hotspur, which ended in a 0–0 draw and qualification to the quarter-final for the first time in eleven years for Milan, by winning 1–0 on aggregate.

International career
Tomori was eligible to represent Nigeria at international level through his parents, Canada through his birth in Calgary and England through having lived in the country since he was a child.

Canada
On 27 March 2016, Tomori captained Canada U20 to a 2–1 victory over England U20 on his third appearance for the nation.

England

Youth 
On 16 May 2016, in the next international break and a day after making his professional club debut, Tomori was called up to the England U19 squad. On 4 June, Tomori made his England U19 debut in a 2–0 defeat against Mexico U20s, playing the full 90 minutes. Tomori was also part of the England 2016 UEFA European Under-19 Championship squad which reached the semi-finals before being knocked out by Italy.

Tomori was selected for the England under-20 team in the 2017 FIFA U-20 World Cup. Tomori however scored an own goal in England's second group game against Guinea. Nevertheless, Tomori would help England beat Venezuela in the final 1–0, which was England's first win in a global tournament since their World Cup victory of 1966.

On 27 May 2019, Tomori was included in England's 23-man squad for the 2019 UEFA European Under-21 Championship.

Senior
On 3 October 2019, Tomori received his first call-up to the England senior squad for forthcoming Euro 2020 qualifying matches. He later said he was committed to playing for England, following interest from Nigeria and Canada; he had previously represented Canada at youth level. Tomori made his debut for England on 17 November against Kosovo in a Euro 2020 qualifier.

Career statistics

Club

International

Honours
Chelsea Youth
FA Youth Cup: 2014–15, 2015–16
UEFA Youth League: 2014–15, 2015–16

Chelsea
FA Cup runner-up: 2019–20

AC Milan
Serie A: 2021–22

England U20
FIFA U-20 World Cup: 2017

England U21
Toulon Tournament: 2018

Individual
UEFA European Under-19 Championship Team of the Tournament: 2016
Chelsea Academy Player of the Year: 2016
Derby County Player of the Year: 2018–19
Chelsea Goal of the Year: 2019–20
Serie A Team of the Year: 2021–22

See also
List of England international footballers born outside England

References

External links

Profile at the AC Milan website

Profile at the Football Association website

1997 births
Living people
Soccer players from Calgary
Canadian soccer players
English footballers
Association football defenders
Chelsea F.C. players
Brighton & Hove Albion F.C. players
Hull City A.F.C. players
Derby County F.C. players
A.C. Milan players
Premier League players
English Football League players
Serie A players
Canada men's youth international soccer players
England youth international footballers
England under-21 international footballers
England international footballers
English expatriate footballers
Expatriate footballers in Italy
English expatriate sportspeople in Italy
Black Canadian soccer players
Black British sportsmen
Canadian sportspeople of Nigerian descent
English people of Nigerian descent
Canadian emigrants to England